The year 2010 is the third year in the history of Shark Fights, a mixed martial arts promotion based in the United States. In 2010 Shark Fights held 6 events beginning with, Shark Fights 8: Super Brawl.

Events list

Shark Fights 8: Super Brawl

Shark Fights 8: Super Brawl was an event held on February 5, 2010 at the Fair Park Coliseum in Lubbock, Texas.

Results

Shark Fights 9: Phillips vs Evans

Shark Fights 9: Phillips vs Evans was an event held on March 20, 2010 at the Amarillo Civic Center in Amarillo, Texas.

Results

Shark Fights 10: Unfinished Business

Shark Fights 10: Unfinished Business was an event held on April 24, 2010 at the Fair Park Coliseum in Lubbock, Texas.

Results

Shark Fights 11: Humes vs Buentello

Shark Fights 11: Humes vs Buentello was an event held on May 22, 2010 at the Ector County Coliseum in Odessa, Texas.

Results

Shark Fights 12: Unfinished Business

Shark Fights 12: Unfinished Business was an event held on June 26, 2010 at the Gamboa's Outdoor Event Center in Amarillo, Texas.

Results

Shark Fights 13: Jardine vs Prangley

Shark Fights 13: Jardine vs Prangley was an event held on September 11, 2010 at the Amarillo Civic Center in Amarillo, Texas.

Results

References

Shark Fights events
2010 in mixed martial arts